is a Japanese manga series written and illustrated by George Asakura. It was serialized in Shogakukan's Monthly Ikki from 2003 to 2006, with its chapters collected in four tankōbon volumes. It was adapted into a live-action film, directed by Sakichi Sato, that premiered in Japan in November 2008

Media

Manga
Heibon Punch, written and illustrated by George Asakura, was serialized in Shogakukan's Monthly Ikki from 2003 to 2006. Shogakukan collected its chapters in four tankōbon volumes, released from April 30, 2004 to June 30, 2006.

Volume list

Live-action film
A live-action film adaptation, directed by Sakichi Sato, premiered in Japan on November 22, 2008. The film was released on DVD on March 25, 2009.

References

Further reading

External links

Romantic comedy anime and manga
Seinen manga
Shogakukan manga
Japanese romantic comedy films